Craig Adam Terrill (born June 27, 1980) is a former National Football League (NFL) defensive tackle who played for the Seattle Seahawks. In 88 career games, Terrill had 103 combined tackles, with eight sacks, three fumble recoveries, and one touchdown. He played college football at Purdue. He was drafted by the Seattle Seahawks in the sixth round of the 2004 NFL Draft. He blocked eight field goals in his career, tied for the Seahawks team record.

Early life
Terrill was born on June 27, 1980, in Lebanon, Indiana. Growing up, Terrill had two brothers, Jason and Troy; Jason taught him how to play guitar and played college football at Ball State, whereas Troy played college basketball at Indiana University – Purdue University Indianapolis. Craig played high school football with the Lebanon Tigers, where he set a record for most sacks in a season, with 27, and graduated as the team's all-time sack leader. Terrill was named First-team All-State during his senior year.

Playing career
The Seattle Seahawks drafted Terrill with selection number 189 in the sixth round of the 2004 NFL Draft. In 2010, Profootballtalk.com writer Gregg Rosenthal described Terrill as a "key member of the [Seattle's] defensive tackle rotation." Seattle released Terrill in September 2010 before signing him again to play 12 games in the 2010 season.

Personal life
In 2004, Terrill wrote articles for The Spokesman-Review. He is an uncle to Luke Terrill, who played college football as a defensive tackle for the Western Illinois Leathernecks. Terrill is also a talented musician. In college, Craig and his brother Jason formed a band called The Strangers. Later, Terrill was the lead singer of The Craig Terrill Band in Seattle. He released two original albums, CT and Genuine. He played with the late Seahawks owner, Paul Allen's, band to open for Seal at a concert in Seattle. Terrill is married to Rachel Terrill, who has a Ph.D in communication from the University of South Florida. In 2015, Terrill worked as an assistant coach for the Lebanon High School football team.

Notes

References

External links
 Seattle Seahawks bio
 Video interview with Terrill

1980 births
Living people
Players of American football from Indiana
American football defensive tackles
Purdue Boilermakers football players
Seattle Seahawks players
People from Lebanon, Indiana